Schwebach (Luxembourgish: Schweebech) is a village in northwestern Luxembourg.

It is situated in the commune of Saeul and has a population of 73.

Gallery

References 

Villages in Luxembourg